MusiqInTheMagiq is the sixth studio album by the R&B singer Musiq Soulchild. It was released on April 29, 2011, on Atlantic Records. The album entered the Billboard 200 chart at number eight, selling 34,000 copies in its first week.  As of 2016, the album has sold over 111,000 copies.

Singles 
No physical singles were released from the album, though two songs came out as iTunes singles, "Anything" and "Yes". The music video for "Anything" was directed by Phillip "Taj" Jackson and was officially released on May 3, 2011, on iTunes.

Critical reception

Mark Edward Nero from About.com praised the decision by both the composers and producers to craft more up-tempo tracks that "benefit from marriages between Musiq's soft vocals and bass-and-drum-driven beats." He concluded that, "By blending his trademark starry-eyed romanticism with more urgent musical enthusiasm, Musiq has managed to craft a formula that's resulted in one of the better albums of his career so far." AllMusic's Andy Kellman said that the record "does not stray far from Musiq's past but features some developments, such as the singer's increased comfort with falsetto deployment ("Sayido," "Waitingstill") and a charming mid-'60s soul throwback ("Love Contract")." He gave notable praise to the final track "Likethesun" for having Musiq's best vocal performance over "stop-start percussion patterns and swarming synthesizers", saying he should do more of that style in later projects. PopMatters contributor David Amidon found the album "pretty bland and uninspiring", criticizing the production choices in beats and vocals, and the lyricism feeling thin on tracks like "Single" and "Anything", concluding that "Little hints of Musiq's talents crop up here and there on MusiqInTheMagiq, but they're too few and far between to really recommend your cash come Musiq's way this time."

Track listing

Deluxe edition 

 (co.) Co-producer

 Notes
Premium edition includes:
 deluxe edition CD with bonus tracks;
 18" x 18" MusiqInTheMagiq poster — autographed for the first 250 customers;
 full album stream session 72 hours before release date;
 immediate MP3 download of "Anything".

Personnel
Credits for MusiqInTheMagiq adapted from Allmusic. Writers listed at track listing section.

Musicians

 Eddie Allen – trumpet
 Arden "Keyz" Altino – Fender Rhodes, keyboards, producer, synthesizer strings
 Nerva Altino – piano
 Kafele Bandele – horn
 Obed Calvaire – drums, percussion
 Mike DeSalvo – engineer
 Charissa Dowe – violin
 Keith "Lil Wonda" Duplessis – keyboards
 Mark "Lace" Gibbs – percussion

 Wayne Jeffrey – acoustic guitar
 James Lewis – guitar
 Eli Menezes – guitar, percussion
 Joseph Prielzony – strings
 Anthony Reyes – bass guitar, guitar
 Gabe Robles – assistant
 Jay Rodriguez – baritone saxophone
 Mark Williams – trombone
 Andrew Yu – cello
 Hitesh Ceon & Kim Ofstad – all instruments on tracks produced by ELEMENT
 Carl "MellowMomentum" Adams – all instruments on tracks produced by MellowMomentum

Production

 Carl "MellowMomentum" Adams – producer
 Warren Babson – engineer
 Nick Bilardello – art direction, design, illustrations
 Hitesh Ceon (of ELEMENT) – instrumentation, producer, vocal producer
 Kris Clark – assistant
 Jerry "Wonda" Duplessis – producer
 Zvi Edelman – A&R
 Lanre Gaba – A&R
 Moses Gallart – engineer
 Chris Gehringher – mastering
 Christopher "Drumma Boy" Gholson – producer
 Guerby Girault – assistant
 Rob Gold – art manager
 Victor Greig – executive producer
 Koby Hass – assistant, engineer, percussion
 Ronnie "Lil' Ronnie" Jackson – producer
 Taalib "Musiq Soulchild" Johnson – executive producer, vocal producer
 The Kaliphat – producer
 Claude Kelly – vocal producer
 Glen Marchese – engineer, mixing

 Masa – Illustrations
 Kevin Matela – assistant
 Clint Nelson – assistant, engineer
 Sheryl Nields – photography
 Mitchell O'Brien – assistant
 Kim Ofstad (of ELEMENT) – instrumentation, producer, vocal producer
 Geno Regist – engineer
 August Rigo – executive producer, vocals
 Nick Roache – engineer
 Nick Romei – package manager
 Kevin Schinstock – assistant, engineer
 Jack Splash – arranger, producer
 John Stephens (aka John Legend) – producer
 Dana "Rockwilder" Stinson – producer
 Sergio "Sergical" Tsai – engineer
 Tai Tsosie – assistant
 Mario Velazquez – assistant
 Billy Villane – assistant, engineer
 Jesse "Corparal" Wilson – producer
 Kevin "Kev-O" Wilson – assistant

Charts

Weekly charts

Year-end charts

Release history

References

2011 albums
Musiq Soulchild albums
Atlantic Records albums
Albums produced by Jack Splash